Mahmudabad (also Romanized as Maḩmūdābād) is a village in Kamalabad Rural District of the Central District of Karaj County, Alborz province, Iran. At the census in 2006, the population was 2,430 in 680 households. At the most recent census of 2016, the population was 3,817 in 1,254 households; it is the largest village in its rural district.

Mahmudabad is located to the northwest of the city of Karaj and above the Gohardasht region, having a very clean and temperate climate.

References 

Karaj County

Populated places in Alborz Province

Populated places in Karaj County